The New River is a  river in Huron County, Michigan. It flows north into Lake Huron, reaching the lake just west of Huron City.

See also
List of rivers of Michigan

References

Michigan  Streamflow Data from the USGS

Rivers of Michigan
Rivers of Huron County, Michigan
Tributaries of Lake Huron